The Avimech Dragonfly DF-1 is an American helicopter produced by Avimech International Aircraft, Inc. of Tucson, Arizona. Originally developed in Switzerland, the aircraft is supplied complete and ready-to-fly.

Design and development
It features a single main rotor and tail rotor, a single-seat, open cockpit without a windshield, skid landing gear with ground handling wheels.

The rotor is driven by tip jets fueled by hydrogen peroxide, which emits only water vapour and oxygen as exhaust products. The tail rotor is fitted only for directional control as it is not required to counteract torque, as the tip jet system does not require torque compensation.

The aircraft fuselage is made from steel and aluminum tubing.

Specifications (DF-1)

See also
List of rotorcraft
List of aircraft (An–Az)

References

External links

Video of DF-1 flight

DF-1
2010s United States sport aircraft
2010s United States ultralight aircraft
2010s United States civil utility aircraft
2010s United States helicopters
Tipjet-powered helicopters